Växjö HF is a handball club in Växjö, Sweden, established 1972 out of Växjö BK. The men's team played three seasons in the Swedish top division during the early 1990s.

The men's junior team won the Swedish national championship in the year 2000, while the girls' team won the Swedish national championship of 2003. It is the mother club of Swedish player Jonas Källman.

Kits

References

External links
  
 

1972 establishments in Sweden
Handball clubs established in 1972
Sport in Växjö
Swedish handball clubs